Heather Wilson (born 1 April 1982) is an Irish racing cyclist.

Palmarès

2006
2nd, Irish National Time Trial Championships
3rd, Irish National Road Race Championships
3rd, Stage 2, Danny Boy International, Limavady

2007
3rd, Irish National Time Trial Championships

2008
2nd, Irish National Time Trial Championships
3rd, Irish National Road Race Championships

2009
1st,  Irish National Elite Road Race Championships (CN)
2nd, Irish National Time Trial Championships

2010
2nd, Irish National Time Trial Championships
12th, Irish National Elite Road Race Championships

References

1982 births
Living people
Irish female cyclists
Cyclists at the 2010 Commonwealth Games
Commonwealth Games competitors for Northern Ireland